The house nicknamed "Idle Hours" was built in 1903 by architect Frank T. Smith for L.P. Ogden and his wife Cynthia. Because the house was considered to be out in the country at the time of its construction, Mrs. Ogden preferred to retain her town home and named her new country estate "Idle Hours".  The house was added to the National Register of Historic Places in 1978.

The home was owned by several prominent Beaumont families. In 1970 it was donated to Land Manor, a non-profit organization which subsequently converted the residence into a halfway house to help people return to society. In 2002 it once again became a private residence of the Bienvenu family and continues to be known by the many locals as "Bienvenu Manor". The Bienvenu family continues to do extensive renovations to restore the carriage house, servant's quarters and the large main house.

See also

National Register of Historic Places listings in Jefferson County, Texas

References

Buildings and structures in Beaumont, Texas
Houses on the National Register of Historic Places in Texas
Houses in Jefferson County, Texas
National Register of Historic Places in Jefferson County, Texas